V with diagonal stroke (Ꝟ, ꝟ) is a letter of the Latin alphabet, derived from V with the addition of a bar through the left stroke.

Usage 
This letter is used in medieval texts as an abbreviation for vir, ver, and vere, as in Latin virgo, a maiden, or Portuguese ver, to see, conversa, conversation, or vereador, member of a town council.

Computer encodings
Capital and small V with diagonal stroke is encoded in Unicode as of version 5.1, at codepoints U+A75E and U+A75F.

References

Bibliography 
 Adriano Cappelli, Lexicon Abbreviaturarum, J. J. Weber, Leipzig (1928).

Phonetic transcription symbols
Latin letters with diacritics